Gerhard Mussner (born 5 October 1943) is an Italian former alpine skier. He competed at the 1968 Winter Olympics in the downhill, slalom and giant slalom events with the best result of 11th place in the downhill.

References

External links
 

1943 births
Living people
Italian male alpine skiers
Olympic alpine skiers of Italy
Alpine skiers at the 1968 Winter Olympics
People from Sëlva
Ladin people
Sportspeople from Südtirol